The 2012–13 Inter-National League season was the first season of the Inter-National League, a multi-national ice hockey league consisting of teams from Austria and Slovenia. It served as the successor to the Austrian National League, which had operated as the second level of ice hockey in Austria. Six teams - four from Austria and two from Slovenia - participated in the league, and Bregenzerwald won the championship.

Regular season

Playoffs

External links
 Inter-National-League on the Austrian Ice Hockey Federation website

Inter-National League seasons
1
2012–13 in Austrian ice hockey leagues
2012–13 in Slovenian ice hockey